Jalalpur may refer to:
 Jalalpur, Ambedkar Nagar district, Uttar Pradesh, India
 Jalalpur (Assembly constituency), the Uttar Pradesh Assembly constituency centered around the town
 Jalalpur Bhattian, Hafizabad, Pakistan
 Jalalpur Jattan, Gujrat, Punjab, Pakistan
 Jalalpur, Murah, a village in Gaya district, Bihar, India
 Jalalpur Pirwala, Multan, Pakistan
 Jalalpur Sharif, Jhelum, Punjab, Pakistan
 Jalalpur, Tekari (census code 254691), a village in Gaya district, Bihar, India
 Jalalpur, Tekari (census code 254808), a village in Gaya district, Bihar, India
 Jalalpur (Vidhan Sabha constituency), an assembly constituency in Saran district, Bihar, India
 Jalalpur, Amawan, a village in Raebareli district, Uttar Pradesh, India
 Jalalpur, Bachhrawan, a village in Raebareli district, Uttar Pradesh, India
 Jalalpur, Malda, a census town in Malda district, West Bengal, India